= Mechode =

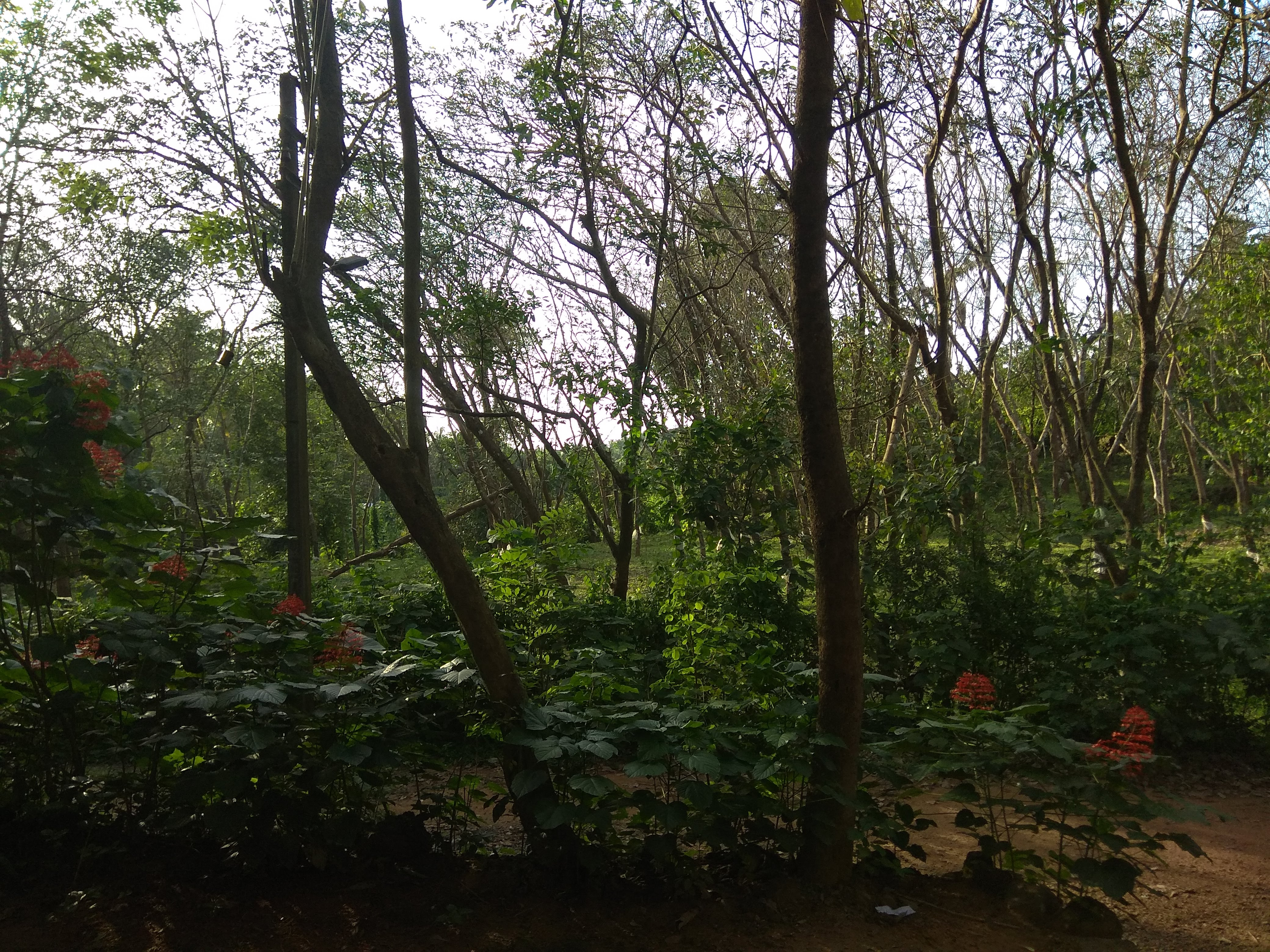
- Rubber trees in Mechode
- Time zone: IST
- Postal code: 678543

Mechode is a village in Palakkad District, Kerala, India. Its postal code is 678543.
